Henry Bates (3 December 1880 – 9 September 1942) was an English cricketer. He played two first-class matches for Middlesex in 1909.

See also
 List of Middlesex County Cricket Club players

References

External links
 

1880 births
1942 deaths
English cricketers
Middlesex cricketers
People from Shoreditch
Cricketers from Greater London